The Bombay Burmah Trading Corporation Limited (BBTC) is an Indian trading company based in Mumbai which is owned by the Wadia Group. It was formed in 1863 by the Wallace Brothers of Scotland. It is India's oldest publicly traded company, and was established to engage in the Burmese tea business through the initial step of taking over the Burmese assets of William Wallace.

The company's founding occurred when the six Wallace Brothers, originally members of a Scottish merchant house in Edinburgh, first arrived in Bombay (now Mumbai) in the 1840s. A Bombay partnership was formed in 1848 as "Wallace Bros & Co". In the mid-1850s the Wallaces set up a business in Rangoon, shipping tea to Bombay. In 1863 the business was floated as "The Bombay Burmah Trading Corporation". Its equity was held by both Indian merchants along with the Wallace Brothers, who had the controlling interests. By the 1870s the company was a leading producer of teak in Burma and Siam, as well as having interests in cotton, oil exploration and shipping.

British motivations for the third Anglo-Burmese War were partly influenced by concerns of the BBTC. The Burmese state's conflict with the BBTC furnished British leaders with a pretext for conquest. By the 1880s Wallace Brothers had become a leading financial house in London. This firm was able to affect the intelligence about Burma and, more critically, about the growing French influence in the country.

The Vissanji family purchased the company from the Wallace brothers around the time of Indian independence. In 1992, the BBTC acquired and merged in BCL Springs. Later, BBTC was acquired by the Wadia group based in Bombay.

See also

 List of oldest companies
 List of oldest companies in India
 List of trading companies

Further reading
 Arnold Cecil Pointon, Bombay Burmah Trading Corporation 1863-1963 (Southampton: The Millbrook Press. 1964) 142 pp. 
 RH Macaulay, History of Bombay Burmah Trading Corporation 1864 -1910 (London, 1934).
 Anthony Webster, Gentlemen Capitalists: British Imperialism in South East Asia 1770-1890. (London: Tauris Academic Studies. 1998)

References

Economic history of India
Trading companies of the United Kingdom
Indian companies established in 1863
Companies based in Mumbai
Wadia Group
Companies listed on the National Stock Exchange of India
Companies listed on the Bombay Stock Exchange
Tea companies of India
Shipping companies of India
Oil and gas companies of India
Cotton industry in India
Forest products companies
India–Myanmar relations
Third Anglo-Burmese War